The following lists events that happened during 1970 in Cape Verde.

Incumbents
Colonial governor: António Adriano Faria Lopes dos Santos

Events
Population: 271,279

References

 
1970 in the Portuguese Empire
Years of the 20th century in Cape Verde
1970s in Cape Verde
Cape Verde
Cape Verde